DG Sea Connect is a RORO/ROPAX ferry service connecting Ghogha and Hazira in Gulf of Khambhat in Gujarat state of India. The original route to Dahej was opened in 2017 and suspended in early 2020 due to lack of financial feasibility in dredging the siltation after the channel was silted up due to floods.

{
"type": "FeatureCollection", "features":  [
{
  "type": "Feature",
  "geometry": { "type": "Point", "coordinates": [72.28, 21.68]},
  "properties": {
    "title": "Ghogha",
    "marker-color": "228b22",
    "marker-size": "medium",
    "marker-symbol": "ferry"
  }
},
{
  "type": "Feature",
  "geometry": { "type": "Point", "coordinates": [72.533333,
          21.7] },
  "properties": {
    "title": "Dahej",
    "marker-color": "228b22",
    "marker-size": "medium",
    "marker-symbol": "ferry"
  }
},
{
  "type": "Feature",
  "geometry": { "type": "Point", "coordinates": [72.64772, 21.13451] },
  "properties": {
    "title": "Hazira",
    "marker-color": "228b22",
    "marker-size": "medium",
    "marker-symbol": "ferry"
  }
}
 ]
}

History

The project was started in 2012 by Narendra Modi, the then Chief Minister of Gujarat. The first phase between Ghogha and Dahej cost  to the exchequer. It was envisioned to reduce the travel time between the two places from 6–8 hours by road to 1-1.5 hours by sea. The RORO services was launched by Indian Prime Minister Narendra Modi on 22 October 2017. The ROPAX passenger services were launched in August 2018 by the Chief Minister Vijay Rupani.

In first one and half year, the services were suspended six times due to various reasons. The services were again suspended from October 2019 to February 2020 due to siltation at Dahej. It was again suspended on 21 March 2020 due to dredging issue. Gujarat Maritime Board had spent  to dredge a five metre draft for the ferry in financial year 2018-19. Later it was announced that Dahej-Ghogha ferry was permanently suspended due to siltation and lack of financial feasibility in dredging. Small vessels will be operated instead. In March 2021, a ferry service carrying only passengers was restarted. The smaller ship has a capacity of 130 passengers and makes a single trip daily.

An alternative jetty at Hazira was considered for the services. In July 2020, Adani Hazira won the bid to lease their jetty. The ROPAX services between Ghogha and Hazira was inaugurated on 8 November 2020 by Prime Minister Modi.

Operations 

The ferry is operated by the Indigo Seaways Pvt Ltd in partnership with Gujarat Maritime Board.

The ferry is 2015 Korean-built Voyage Symphony model. It has a capacity of 525 passengers, 80 cars and 30 trucks. Between October 2017 and August 2019, about 3.31 lakh passengers and 7000 vehicles had used the service.

See also 
 RORO ferries in India
 Indian Rivers Inter-link
 List of National Waterways in India
 Sagar Mala project, national water port development connectivity scheme
 Water transport in India

References

External links
 

Transport in Gujarat
Ferry transport in India
Bhavnagar district
2017 introductions
Bharuch district
Surat district
Water transport in India